The 2016 2. divisjon (referred to as PostNord-ligaen for sponsorship reasons) was a Norwegian football third-tier league season. The league consisted of 56 teams divided into 4 groups of 14 teams.

In February 2016 it was announced a change in format, starting in the 2017 season, that would reduce the number of groups from four to two. Therefore, the winners of the four groups will be promoted to the 1. divisjon, while the bottom seven teams in each groups will be relegated to the 3. divisjon.

The league was played as a double round-robin tournament, where all teams played 26 matches. The first round was be played on 9 April 2016, while the last round was played on 22 October 2016.

League tables

Group 1

Group 2

Group 3

Group 4

Scorers

26 goals:

  Endre Kupen - Florø

25 goals:

  Markus Kvame Naglestad - Fram

24 goals:

  Øyvind Løkkebø Gausdal - Vindbjart

21 goals:

  Johnny Buduson - Skeid
  Wilhelm Pepa - Arendal

20 goals:

  Kevin Beugré - Hønefoss
  David Tavakoli - Skeid

18 goals:

  Kaimar Saag - Nybergsund
  Robin Hjelmeseth - Elverum
  Mohammed Ahamed Jama - Tromsdalen
  Kasper Højvig Nissen - Øygarden
  Sindre Mauritz-Hansen - Asker

17 goals:

  Ivar Sollie Rønning - HamKam
  Fabian Stensrud Ness - Moss

16 goals:

  Mesut Can - Grorud
  Johnny Furdal - Øygarden
  Sigurd Hauso Haugen - Odd B
  Jim Andre Johansen - Notodden

15 goals:

  Vegard Båtnes Braaten - Alta

14 goals:

  Torbjørn Grytten - Brattvåg
  Eirik Woll Kampenes - Fyllingsdalen /  Vidar
  Omar Fonstad el Ghaouti - Moss / Lørenskog

13 goals:

  Saihou Jagne - HamKam
  Ole Andreas Mundal Nesset - Elverum
  Almir Hasan Taletovic - Kvik
  Preben Skeie - Vindbjart

12 goals:

  Martin Grong Risan - Byåsen
  Amund Bollingmo Vingelen - Strindheim
  Sondre Hopmark Stokke - Stjørdals-Blink
  Lars Henrik Baal Andreassen - Tromsdalen
  Andreas Ulland Andersen - Vard
  Erlend Ullaland Hove - Florø
  Moses Dramwi Mawa - Bærum
  Emanuel Kot Chol Tafesse - Bærum

11 goals:

  Sebastian Jensen - Senja
  Christer Johnsgård - Tromsø B
  Morten Skulstad Hillestad - Stord
  Stefan Mladenovic - Odd B
  Jan Martin Hoel Andersen - Kvik

10 goals:

  Sigurd Ertsås - Brumunddal
  Jørgen Selnes Sollihaug - Stjørdals-Blink
  Bardh Shala - Grorud
  Magnus Killingberg Nikolaisen - Alta
  Vegard Bergstedt Lysvoll - Tromsdalen
  Dardan Dreshaj - Follo
  Jonas Nikolaisen Simonsen - Finnsnes
  Sondre Liseth - Fana
  Sami Loulanti - Lørenskog
  Kristoffer Kipperberg Tollås - Bærum
  Rasmus Lynge Christensen - Arendal

9 goals:

  Ibrahima Drame - Hønefoss
  Pape Pate Diouf - Molde B
  Arne Gunnes - Byåsen
  Mathias Dahl Abelsen - Alta
  Christian Randa Ellefsen - Harstad
  Håvard Haugen Dalseth - Follo
  Bjarne Damsgård Langeland - Fyllingsdalen
  Bubacarr Sumareh - Vard
  Rashad Muhammed - Florø
  David Eie - Frigg
  Kristoffer Rasmus Rasmussen - Egersund
  Jakob Rasmussen - Arendal
  Bajram Ajeti - Moss
  Christian Østli - Tønsberg

8 goals:

  Ramon Carvalho - Gjøvik-Lyn
  Stian Romslo Torgersen - Strindheim
  Robin Gabriel Palacios Persson - Brattvåg
  Asgeir Volden Snekvik - Byåsen
  Mats Størseth Lillebo - Stjørdals-Blink
  Albert Berbatovci - Nardo
  Daniel Skjølberg Krogstad - Strindheim
  Awat Peyghambernejad - Nybergsund
  El Hadj Sega Ngom - Alta
  Fredrik Levorstad - Follo
  Sebastian Pedersen - Stabæk B
  Kim André Kristiansen Råde - Mo
  Ryan Doghman - Oppsal
  Tor Martin Mienna - Tromsdalen
  Kristoffer Zachariassen - Øygarden
  Kjetil Skogen Kalve - Fyllingsdalen
  Ståle Steen Sæthre - Lysekloster
  Eirik Jakobsen - Vidar
  Runar Ullaland Hove - Florø
  Adnan Cirak - Øygarden
  Vegard Severeide Sætre - Vard
  Alagie Sanyang - Tønsberg
  Ylldren Ibrahimaj - Arendal
  Abdul-Basit Ouro Agouda - Strømsgodset B

7 goals:

  El-mahdi Bellhcen - Elverum
  Jonas Enkerud - Elverum
  Andreas Løvland - Finnsnes
  Remi André Olsen Jakobsen - Mo
  Jesper Solli - Kjelsås
  Ridge J Robinson - Senja
  Håkon Kjæve - Tromsdalen
  Simen Møller - Kjelsås
  Zirak Ahmed - Grorud
  Oskar Johannes Løken - Stabæk B
  Sverre Larsen - Egersund
  Rino Falk Larsen - Vålerenga B
  Vetle Lunde Myhre - Sola
  Daniel Berntsen - Vidar
  Ingvald Sandvik Halgunset - Vidar
  Walid Chafouk Idrissi - Lørenskog
  Carl Henrik Refvik - Vidar
  Knut Ahlander - Strømsgodset B
  Atli Heimisson - Asker
  Tobias Johansen Henanger - Arendal

6 goals:

  Remi-André Svindland - Elverum
  Valentin Blaka - HamKam
  Remond Macougne Mendy - Nybergsund
  Vegard Østraat Erlien - Rosenborg B
  Marius Augdal - Stjørdals-Blink
  Sander Svendsen - Molde B
  Gabriel Andersen - Harstad
  Christian Reginiussen - Alta
  Kevin Mankowitz - Grorud
  Morten-Andre Slorby - Grorud
  Shadi Ali - Follo
  Vebjørn Valle Grunnvoll - Finnsnes
  Ohi Omoijuanfo - Stabæk B
  Imad Ouhadou - Lørenskog
  Jonas Heggestad Hestetun - Fana
  Roger Blokhus Ekeland - Stord
  Henrik Udahl - Vålerenga B
  Øystein Myrkaskog - Førde
  Philip Lund - Egersund
  Magnus Ask Mikkelsen - Fløy-Flekkerøy
  Christian Beqiraj Follerås - Vindbjart
  Kamal Saaliti - Notodden
  Erik Rosland - Fram
  Tim Andre Reinback - Moss
  Tobias Lauritsen - Odd B
  Kim Sjøberg Bentsen - Pors
  Marcin Jacek Pietron - Fram
  Victor Aashildrød Vindfjell - Vindbjart
  Øystein Næsheim - Kvik

5 goals:

  Feisal Ahmed Hassan - Gjøvik-Lyn
  Kristian Eriksen - Brumunddal
  Thomas Olivier Amang A Kegueni - Molde B
  Vegard Ruud - Brumunddal
  Emil Dahle - HamKam
  Mats Lien Vågan - Oppsal
  Magnus Aasarød - Kjelsås
  Sander Birkeland - Finnsnes
  Fredrik Lunde Michalsen - Tromsø B
  Kenneth Di Vita Jensen - Ullern
  Marcus Ursin Ingebrigtsen - Harstad
  Emil Sildnes - Oppsal
  Sondre Laugsand - Senja
  Tobias Schjetne - Finnsnes
  Tomas Kristoffersen - Tromsdalen
  Håkon Saugen Rekdal - Ullern
  Agwa Okuot Obiech - Ullern
  Stefan Alexander Dinessen Aase - Florø
  Baste Bognøy Jonassen - Lysekloster
  Akinbola Olajide Akinyemi - Øygarden
  Jonas Tungeland - Stord
  Lars Christian Kise - Frigg
  Petrit Zhubi - Lysekloster
  Fredrik Flo - Fana
  Herman Sørby Stengel - Vålerenga B
  Kittiphong Pluemjai - Øygarden
  Tarjei Skoftedalen Fiskum - Pors
  Adnan Hadzic - Ørn Horten
  Eric Bugale Kitolano - Odd B
  Andreas Hoven - Strømsgodset B
  Lasse Bransdal - Tønsberg
  Magnus Høgetveit Hallandvik - Fløy-Flekkerøy
  André Bakke - Notodden

4 goals:

  Trace Akino Murray - Hønefoss
  Harmohan Singh - Brattvåg
  Tanoh Franck Boris Semou - HamKam
  Juan Alexander Garcia Alonso - Nybergsund
  Mats Oliver Arntsen Bjerkan - Byåsen
  Andreas Weigner Rye - Strindheim
  Joakim Danielsen Solem - Nardo
  Kenneth Diallo - Gjøvik-Lyn
  Dag Alexander Olsen - Gjøvik-Lyn
  Adnan Cirak - Elverum
  Agnaldo Pinto de Moraes Junior - Molde B
  Michael Karlsen - Brattvåg

3 goals:

  Marius Dalsaune Nossum - Byåsen
  Ole Petter Berget - Hønefoss
  Eman Markovic - Molde B
  Henning Røe - Tynset
  Lamine Larbi Nekrouf - Brattvåg
  Fredrik Rynning Andresen - Tynset
  Hans Peter Emil Westberg - Gjøvik-Lyn
  Henrik Lehne Olsen - Brumunddal / HamKam
  Ole Erik Midtskogen - Tynset / HamKam
  Ole Kristian Graff Nygård - Nybergsund
  Ruben Alegre Guerra - Gjøvik-Lyn
  Sami Kamel - Hønefoss
  Joachim Erlend Olufsen - Strindheim
  Lars Martin Husby - Stjørdals-Blink
  Sander Erik Kartum - Stjørdals-Blink
  Yongyong Hou - Rosenborg B
  Andre Brendryen - Tynset
  Erlend Tjøtta Vie - Strindheim
  Fredrik Lund - Strindheim
  Olaus Jair Skarsem - Rosenborg B

References 

Norwegian Second Division seasons
3
Norway
Norway